The term Ottoman Serbia may refer to:

 Ottoman Serbia, historiographical term for various parts of modern-day Serbia during the period of Ottoman rule, from the late 14th century, up to 1912
 Vassal Ottoman Despotate of Serbia, in the 15th century.
 Vassal Ottoman Principality of Serbia, in the 19th century.

See also
 Serbia (disambiguation)
 Habsburg Serbia (disambiguation)
 Moravian Serbia (disambiguation)